Wien Hirschstetten is a railway station serving Donaustadt, the twenty-second district of Vienna.

Services 
 the following services stop at Wien Hirschstetten:

References

External links 
 
 

Railway stations in Vienna
Austrian Federal Railways